Youth of the Progress Party is the youth wing of the Progress Party of Denmark.

External links 
 

Youth wings of political parties in Denmark
Youth wings of conservative parties